In four-dimensional geometry, a cantellated 24-cell is a convex uniform 4-polytope, being a cantellation (a 2nd order truncation) of the regular 24-cell.

There are 2 unique degrees of cantellations of the 24-cell including permutations with truncations.

Cantellated 24-cell

The cantellated 24-cell or small rhombated icositetrachoron is a uniform 4-polytope.

The boundary of the cantellated 24-cell is composed of 24 truncated octahedral cells, 24 cuboctahedral cells and 96 triangular prisms. Together they have 288 triangular faces, 432 square faces, 864 edges, and 288 vertices.

Construction
When the cantellation process is applied to 24-cell,
each of the 24 octahedra becomes a small rhombicuboctahedron.
In addition however, since each octahedra's edge was previously shared with two
other octahedra, the separating edges form the three parallel edges of a 
triangular prism - 96 triangular prisms, since the 24-cell contains 96 edges.
Further, since each vertex was previously shared with 12 faces,
the vertex would split into 12 (24*12=288) new vertices.
Each group of 12 new vertices forms a cuboctahedron.

Coordinates
The Cartesian coordinates of the vertices of the cantellated 24-cell having edge length 2 are all permutations of coordinates and sign of:

 (0, 2+2)
 (1, 1+, 1+, 1+2)

The permutations of the second set of coordinates coincide with the vertices of an inscribed runcitruncated tesseract.

The dual configuration has all permutations and signs of:
(0,2,2+,2+)
(1,1,1+,3+)

Structure
The 24 small rhombicuboctahedra are joined to each other via their triangular faces, to the cuboctahedra via their axial square faces, and to the triangular prisms via their off-axial square faces. The cuboctahedra are joined to the triangular prisms via their triangular faces. Each triangular prism is joined to two cuboctahedra at its two ends.

Cantic snub 24-cell 

The cantellated 24-cell has 2 positions of triangular faces in ratio of 96 and 192, while the cantic snub 24-cell has 3 positions of 96 triangles.

The difference can be seen in the vertex figures, with edges representing faces in the 4-polytope:

Images

Related polytopes 
The convex hull of two cantellated 24-cells in opposite positions is a nonuniform polychoron composed of 864 cells: 48 cuboctahedra, 144 square antiprisms, 384 octahedra (as triangular antipodiums), 288 tetrahedra (as tetragonal disphenoids), and 576 vertices. Its vertex figure is a shape topologically equivalent to a cube with a triangular prism attached to one of its square faces.

Cantitruncated 24-cell

The cantitruncated 24-cell or great rhombated icositetrachoron is a uniform 4-polytope derived from the 24-cell. It is bounded by 24 truncated cuboctahedra corresponding with the cells of a 24-cell, 24 truncated cubes corresponding with the cells of the dual 24-cell, and 96 triangular prisms corresponding with the edges of the first 24-cell.

Coordinates
The Cartesian coordinates of a cantitruncated 24-cell having edge length 2 are all permutations of coordinates and sign of:

 (1,1+,1+2,3+3)
 (0,2+,2+2,2+3)

The dual configuration has coordinates as all permutations and signs of:
 (1,1+,1+,5+2)
 (1,3+,3+,3+2)
 (2,2+,2+,4+2)

Projections

Related polytopes

References 
 T. Gosset: On the Regular and Semi-Regular Figures in Space of n Dimensions, Messenger of Mathematics, Macmillan, 1900
 H.S.M. Coxeter: 
 Coxeter, Regular Polytopes, (3rd edition, 1973), Dover edition, p.296, Table I (iii): Regular Polytopes, three regular polytopes in n-dimensions (n≥5)
 H.S.M. Coxeter, Regular Polytopes, 3rd Edition, Dover New York, 1973, p.296, Table I (iii): Regular Polytopes, three regular polytopes in n-dimensions (n≥5)
 Kaleidoscopes: Selected Writings of H.S.M. Coxeter, edited by F. Arthur Sherk, Peter McMullen, Anthony C. Thompson, Asia Ivic Weiss, Wiley-Interscience Publication, 1995,  
 (Paper 22) H.S.M. Coxeter, Regular and Semi Regular Polytopes I, [Math. Zeit. 46 (1940) 380-407, MR 2,10]
 (Paper 23) H.S.M. Coxeter, Regular and Semi-Regular Polytopes II, [Math. Zeit. 188 (1985) 559-591]
 (Paper 24) H.S.M. Coxeter, Regular and Semi-Regular Polytopes III, [Math. Zeit. 200 (1988) 3-45]
 John H. Conway, Heidi Burgiel, Chaim Goodman-Strass, The Symmetries of Things 2008,  (Chapter 26. pp. 409: Hemicubes: 1n1)
 Norman Johnson Uniform Polytopes, Manuscript (1991)
 N.W. Johnson: The Theory of Uniform Polytopes and Honeycombs, Ph.D. (1966)
 
  x3o4x3o - srico, o3x4x3o - grico

4-polytopes